"The Ruum" is a 1953 science fiction short story by American writer Arthur Porges.

Plot summary
A shape-shifting, indestructible robot—a "Type H-9 Ruum"—is accidentally left behind on earth during the age of the dinosaurs by visiting aliens, and not recovered because their ship is destroyed in a battle. The Ruum's work is to collect different species of animal within a 30-mile radius, weighing 160 pounds (give or take 15 pounds) and preserve them in a state of suspended animation for later retrieval.

Millions of years later Jim Irwin, a uranium prospector in the Canadian Rocky Mountains, encounters the Ruum's specimens, animals which include modern and prehistoric mammals and a small Stegosaurus. He notices the animals are all of a uniform size and are not dead, despite some being millions of years old. Rather, they are paralyzed, and apparently fully conscious, in a living death. The still-functioning Ruum appears, extending gripping hooks and a probe dripping green liquid. Irwin realizes the alien device intends to paralyze him. Shooting it with a rifle does not damage it, and Irwin flees as it pursues him at a steady five miles per hour. It is noted that Irwin weighs 149 pounds.

Fit and military-trained, Irwin attempts to evade and destroy the Ruum. First he hides above his trail and drops a boulder on it, but this fails to damage it. Then he climbs a sheer cliff, but the Ruum extrudes a climbing claw to the ledge where he is hidden. He tries to dislodge it with a stick, and finds the Ruum can generate an electric shock. He shoots it and dislodges it, but the Ruum is unharmed by the fall and responds by growing multiple claws. Having had no time for food or sleep, Irwin eventually circles back to his camp and sets a trap with dynamite. Taking advantage of the Ruum's distraction by a grizzly bear, which it kills, he detonates the dynamite using a pistol bullet.

Dazed by the explosion, he sees the Ruum still unharmed and still approaching. Exhausted and defenseless, he awaits his addition to its collection. However, it lifts him up, then puts him back down and leaves. His colleague Walt Leonard arrives by seaplane and rescues him. Safely in the plane, they make plans to bring a helicopter and collect some of the Ruum's specimens in its absence to sell to scientists. Leonard comments on Irwin's haggard appearance, guessing him to have lost 10 pounds during the chase,
Yet some people thought he was out of the 30 mile limit on the Ruum.

Sequel
A sequel to "The Ruum", titled "A Specimen for the Queen", appeared in the May 1960 edition of The Magazine of Fantasy and Science Fiction.

Following the events of the original story, it is mentioned in passing that the Ruum succeeds in paralyzing a human (implied to be an ironic self-insert of Porges himself). Subsequently, a spacecraft belonging to a race of militant ant-people arrives on Earth. Mistaking the Ruum for an item of human technology they take it aboard, intending to present it to their Queen as an amusing novelty. Back on their homeworld, the giant Queen is engaged in laying thousands of eggs that will hatch into soldier ants, the vanguard of an army that will conquer the galaxy. However, once the ant spaceship is on course for its home planet, the Ruum paralyzes the captain in the control room and kills any other ants who attempt to approach. With no one at the controls, the ship crashes into the planet at high velocity and is vaporized. The almost-indestructible Ruum survives, although the impact has affected its programming, increasing the weight of specimens it is intended to paralyze. Unfortunately for the ants, their Queen's weight now falls comfortably within this range, and the Ruum soon detects her and sets off in her direction.

Reprints
"The Ruum" was selected by David Drake for his 1988 anthology Things Hunting Men, where he commented that this was one of Porges seventy-some "meticulously crafted stories" where "sometimes the problem the protagonist faces really is insoluble." But, here, Jim Irwin never gives up.

Many other reprints are listed at the ISFDB.

References

External links
  The Ruum at sphstigers.org

1953 short stories
Works originally published in The Magazine of Fantasy & Science Fiction
Prehistoric life in popular culture
Robots in literature